Jeanie Marie Buss (born September 26, 1961) is an American sports executive who is the controlling owner and president of the Los Angeles Lakers of the National Basketball Association (NBA), and co-owner and promoter of the U.S. women's professional wrestling promotion Women of Wrestling.

A daughter of Jerry Buss, who owned the Lakers and other sports businesses, she entered the family business as general manager of the Los Angeles Strings professional tennis team at 19.  She later bought the Los Angeles Blades professional roller hockey team.   She served as president of the Great Western Forum before becoming vice president of the Lakers. After her father died in 2013, his controlling ownership of the Lakers passed to his six children via a family trust, with each sibling receiving an equal vote. Buss took over as team president and as the Lakers representative on the NBA Board of Governors. In 2020, she became the first female controlling owner to guide her team to an NBA championship, giving her six NBA titles overall as an owner/executive.

Early life
Born in Santa Monica, California, Buss was the third of four children to Joann and Jerry Buss, and one of two daughters; she grew up with older brothers Johnny and Jim and younger sister Janie. Their parents divorced in 1972, leaving Buss feeling emotionally abandoned. At age 14, Buss attended World Team Tennis meetings with her father, who owned the Los Angeles Strings. When she was 17, she moved in with her father at Pickfair. She became so familiar with the estate that she led guided tours. Buss attended college at the University of Southern California (USC), where she majored in business and graduated with honors.

Professional career
World TeamTennis folded in 1978, and was revived in 1981 as TeamTennis. Jerry once again owned the second incarnation of the Strings, and he appointed the 19-year-old Jeanie as the general manager while she was studying at USC. "Basically, my dad bought me the team," said Buss. After the Strings folded in 1993, Buss brought professional roller hockey to Los Angeles as owner of the Los Angeles Blades in Roller Hockey International. The league named her Executive of the Year. Buss also served four years as president of the Great Western Forum, then the home arena of the Lakers. Throughout her stint with the Forum, her role with the Lakers increased, and she served as the Alternate Governor on the NBA Board of Governors since 1995. In 1999, she was named executive vice president of business operations for the Lakers. Her brother Jim was promoted to vice president of player personnel in 2005. Their father's plan was to have Jeanie handle the business decisions of the team, while Jim handled the basketball side of the Lakers.

Sporting News in 2005 named Buss as one of the Top 20 Most Influential Women in Sports. In 2011, Forbes called Buss "one of few powerful women in sports management", and ESPN said she is "one of the most powerful women in the NBA".

After her father died in 2013, his 66% controlling ownership of the Lakers passed to his six children via a trust, with each child receiving an equal vote. Jerry's succession plan had Jeanie assume his previous title as the Lakers' governor as well as its team representative at NBA Board of Governors meetings. That summer, Buss commented that "I would be more comfortable if I understood what the decision process [on the Lakers' basketball side] was, and I'm not always involved in it." In 2013–14, she became president of the Lakers; she continued to lead the team's business operations, while also overseeing its basketball operations by working with her brother Jim, who continued as executive VP of basketball operations.

Buss terminated Mitch Kupchak as General Manager and accepted the resignation of her brother Jim as VP of Basketball Operations on February 21, 2017, installing Magic Johnson as President of Basketball Operations. Johnson, who played for the Lakers from 1979–1991 and in 1996, had also served as VP, coach, and part-owner of the organization. Buss would then hire sports agent Rob Pelinka to be the new general manager. According to Buss, the team did not go through a public interview process to hire a GM because she did not want to tip off her brother, as the siblings were in a legal battle over control of the team.

In addition to her Lakers' management, Buss is the owner of the WOW-Women Of Wrestling. On October 6, 2021, on top of the Circa Resort & Casino in Las Vegas, ViacomCBS Global Distribution President Dan Cohen announced alongside Buss and her long time business partner David McLane that ViacomCBS had entered into a multi-year distribution agreement for WOW. The distribution for WOW marks the largest media distribution platform for women's wrestling in history.

Personal life

Buss married volleyball player Steve Timmons in 1990, but divorced after three years. According to Buss, "I never put my marriage first ... It was always business which attracted me." She posed nude in the May 1995 issue of Playboy. She was engaged to former Lakers coach and former New York Knicks President Phil Jackson for four years, after dating him since December 1999. On December 27, 2016, Jackson cited "professional obligations and the geographic distance" resulting in breaking off their engagement. After their breakup, Buss consulted with Jackson for input on the Lakers.

In September 2021, Buss announced on Twitter that she was in a relationship with comedian Jay Mohr. They reportedly began dating in 2017.
On December 21, 2022, Jeanie Buss and Jay Mohr publicly announced their engagement.

Awards and honors
Six-time NBA champion
Five as a member of the Lakers front office (2000-2002, 2009, 2010)
One as controlling owner (2020)

Publications

References

1961 births
Living people
Writers from Santa Monica, California
Los Angeles Lakers executives
Los Angeles Lakers owners
Marshall School of Business alumni
21st-century American memoirists
21st-century American women writers
American women memoirists
Los Angeles Blades
Women basketball executives
Professional wrestling promoters